João Felipe Silva Estevam Aguiar (born 24 June 2001) is a Brazilian footballer who plays as forward. He is currently free agent.

Career

Club
On 6 September 2020, Slavia Prague announced the signing of João Felipe on a four-year contract from Palmeiras.

Career statistics

Club

References

External links

2001 births
Living people
Brazilian footballers
Association football forwards
Desportivo Brasil players
Ituano FC players
Sociedade Esportiva Palmeiras players
SK Slavia Prague players
Expatriate footballers in the Czech Republic
Brazilian expatriate sportspeople in the Czech Republic
Footballers from São Paulo (state)
People from Cruzeiro, São Paulo